Whimbrel may refer:

Birds:
 Whimbrel (common), Numenius phaeopus
 Whimbrel (Hudsonian), Numenius hudsonicus
 Bristle-thighed curlew, Numenius tahitiensis

Other uses:
HMS Whimbrel (U29), last surviving Royal Navy warship present at the Japanese Surrender in World War II